A learning augmented algorithm is an algorithm that can make use of a prediction to improve its performance.
Whereas in regular algorithms just the problem instance is inputted, learning augmented algorithms accept an extra parameter.
This extra parameter often is a prediction of some property of the solution.
This prediction is then used by the algorithm to improve its running time or the quality of its output.

Description 
A learning augmented algorithm typically takes an input . The type of the problem instance and the prediction depend on the algorithm. Learning augmented algorithms usually satisfy the following two properties:

 Consistency. A learning augmented algorithm is said to be consistent if the algorithm can be proven to have a good performance when it is provided with an accurate prediction. Usually, this is quantified by giving a bound on the performance that depends on the error in the prediction.
 Robustnesss. An algorithm is called robust if its worst-case performance can be bounded even if the given prediction is inaccurate.

Learning augmented algorithms generally do not prescribe how the prediction should be done. For this purpose machine learning can be used.

Examples

Binary search 
The binary search algorithm is an algorithm for finding elements of a sorted list . It needs  steps to find an element with some known value  in a list of length .

 First, look at position  in the list. If , the element has been found.
 If , do the same as in the previous case, but instead consider .

In the learning augmented algorithm, probing the positions  takes  steps.
Then a binary search is performed on a list of size at most , which takes  steps. This makes the total running time of the algorithm .
So, when the error is small, the algorithm is faster than a normal binary search. This shows that the algorithm is consistent.
Even in the worst case, the error will be at most . Then the algorithm takes at most  steps, so the algorithm is robust.

More examples 
Learning augmented algorithms are known for:
 The ski rental problem
 The maximum weight matching problem
 The weighted paging problem

See also 
 Machine learning

References

External links 
 An overview of publications about learning augmented algorithms

Algorithms
Theoretical computer science